The doctrine of repair and reconstruction in United States patent law distinguishes between permissible repair of a patented article, which the right of an owner of property to preserve its utility and operability guarantees, and impermissible reconstruction of a patented article, which is patent infringement. The doctrine is explained in Aro Mfg. Co. v. Convertible Top Replacement Co. The Aro case states the rule in these terms:

The decisions of this Court require the conclusion that reconstruction of a patented entity,  unpatented elements, is limited to such a true reconstruction of the entity as to "in fact make a new article," after the entity, viewed as a whole, has become spent. In order to call the monopoly, conferred by the patent grant, into play for a second time, it must, indeed, be a second creation of the patented entity. …Mere replacement of individual unpatented parts, one at a time, whether of the same part repeatedly or different parts successively, is no more than the lawful right of the owner to repair his property.

An extension  of the doctrine is a right to modify the product to enhance its functionality, such as to make it operate faster or with a different size of product. The Supreme Court said in Wilbur-Ellis Co. v. Kuther that such a right was "kin  to repair for it bore on the useful capacity of the old combination, on which the royalty had been paid."

The House of Lords declared a similar principle—the doctrine of non-derogation from grants—concerning car owners' repair and replacement of automobile parts, in British Leyland Motor Corp. v. Armstrong Patents Co.

References 

Legal doctrines and principles
United States patent law
Right to Repair